Margaret Rose may refer to:

Princess Margaret, Countess of Snowdon (1930–2002)
, Indian cargo ship

Margaret Rose Henry, American politician
Margaret Rose Kelsick, Montserratian politician
Margaret Preston, Australian painter
Margaret Rose (lyricist) (1888–1948), lyricist who wrote "The Little Road to Bethlehem" with Michael Head
Margaret Rose Sanford, American civic leader
Margaret Rose Vendryes, visual artist
Margaret Rose Robertson Watt

Maggie Rose, character in the 1993 novel Along Came a Spider

See also

Margaret Rowe, Australian former politician